Urvasivo Rakshasivo  is a 2022 Indian Telugu-language romantic comedy film written and directed by Rakesh Sashi and produced by GA2 Pictures and Shri Tirumala Production. A remake of the 2018 Tamil language film Pyaar Prema Kaadhal, the film stars Allu Sirish, Anu Emmanuel, and Vennela Kishore. The music was composed by Achu Rajamani and Anup Rubens, with cinematography was handled by Tanveer Mir and editing by Karthika Srinivas respectively.

The film was released theatrically on 4 November 2022.

Plot
Sree Kumar (Allu Sirish) is a middle-class IT employee with a conservative upbringing. He shares a close bond with his parents, especially his mother, who has a heart condition. His parents want to see him married and actively seek a bride. Sree Kumar is in love with Sindhuja (Anu Emmanuel), his colleague who is broad-minded. While Sree Kumar pursues her for marriage, she has her eyes set on achieving her dream and prefers a live-in relationship. If they ever reach a common ground in this conflict of ideologies forms the rest of the story.

Cast

Production 
Speaking with Hanuma Kiran of 123Telugu, Rakesh Sashii has said that the original idea of the film was pitched by producer Allu Aravind, which he later developed further.

Music

The music is composed by Achu Rajamani and Anup Rubens while the latter did the film score.The audio rights were acquired by Aditya Music.

Release
Initially, the film was titled Prema Kadanta but was changed to Urvasivo Rakshasivo for undisclosed reasons. The film was released in theatres on 4 November 2022. The teaser of the film was released on 29 September 2022. News18 Telugu reported that the film was released in more than 400 movie theaters worldwide. The worldwide theatrical rights were sold for ₹7 crores.

Reception 
123Telugu rated the film 3.25 out of 5 and wrote: "Urvashivo Rakshasivo is an urban romantic comedy which is packaged quite cleverly. Solid comedy, romance, and light hearted family drama are the major assets". Paul Nicodemus of The Times of India rated the film 3 out of 5 stars and called it a "wholesome light hearted entertainer" which has equal amounts of "humour, romance and emotion", also praised the performances and visually pleasing production values. Arvind V of Pinkvilla gave a rating of 3 out of 5 and praised the work by Sashii and further stated that "Allu Sirish has had a sputtering phase and it seems the film under review is going to give his career the much-needed boost". Balakrishna Ganeshan of The News Minute rated the film 2.5 out of 5 stars and wrote "Urvasivo Rakshasivo is one of those rare films where the female character is portrayed as bold and given equal importance".

References

External links
 

2022 films
2020s Telugu-language films
Indian romantic comedy films
2022 romantic comedy films
Films shot in Hyderabad, India
Telugu remakes of Tamil films